Elizabeth MacKenzie (born 1955) is a Canadian artist based in Vancouver. Elizabeth McKenzie or Elizabeth MacKenzie may also refer to:

Beth MacKenzie, (1960–2013), registered nurse and former politician on Prince Edward Island, Canada
Elizabeth McKenzie, American author and editor